Kim Ok-vin (born 3 January 1987), also known as Kim Ok-bin, is a South Korean actress. She made her debut in an online beauty contest in 2004, and began her acting career with a role in the 2005 film Voice. She appeared in the television drama series Over the Rainbow, and in films such as Dasepo Naughty Girls, The Accidental Gangster and the Mistaken Courtesan and The Villainess. She has received several award nominations, and won Best Actress at the 2009 Sitges Film Festival for her role in Thirst.

Early life 
Kim is the eldest of three siblings. She trained in martial arts as a child, and has attained third dan in Hapkido and second dan in Taekwondo. She also practices Muay Thai and boxing. She is interested in cars and motorcycles, speed racing, building computers, and sports such as soccer and baseball. She is ambidextrous.

Career

Early work: 2004–2008
Kim made her debut in an online beauty contest hosted by web portal Naver in 2004. Despite having little prior acting experience, she was cast as one of the three leads in the 2005 horror film Voice, for which she was nominated for Best New Actress at both the Blue Dragon Film Awards and Baeksang Arts Awards.

She next starred as the lead actress in Hanoi Bride, a two-part SBS drama aired during the Chuseok holidays to commemorate the 30th anniversary of the Vietnam War. Her performance as Vietnamese girl Lý Thị Vũ caught the attention of film director E J-yong, who cast her as the main character in his 2006 film Dasepo Naughty Girls, based on a popular webcomic. E commented, "Not many young actresses would be mature enough to completely understand the heroine who has to support the family by selling herself as a prostitute... But Kim seemed like an actress who had the ability to understand the character." She was initially reluctant to take the part, as the original comic had some explicit scenes, but decided to trust the director based on his previous work.

Kim auditioned for a part in the 2006 KBS drama series Hello, God, and after impressing director Ji Yeong-soo with her "intense determination," was handed a leading role as confidence trickster Seo Eun-hye. During filming she expressed self-doubts, saying, "I used to cry two or three times  when the shooting began because I felt that I was a rubbish actress," and with a tight schedule that allowed her less than two hours of sleep per day, was reported to have collapsed on set. Later that year, she appeared in MBC drama Over the Rainbow as aspiring pop singer Jeong Hee-su, a part which required her to sing and master difficult breakdance moves. Series producer Han Hee complimented Kim, saying, "She is a bold actress. She's very enthusiastic about her role with an almost perfectionist attitude." However, she caused some concern when she admitted to only eating one meal per day while filming the drama.

In her next film, The Accidental Gangster and the Mistaken Courtesan, she starred alongside Lee Jung-jae as a Joseon-era kisaeng. She said she had found it difficult performing a historical role, but was helped by consultations with director Yeo Gyoon-dong and studied traditional Korean dance for two months. The film opened in South Korea in December 2008.

2009–present
In February 2008, Kim was announced as the female lead in Park Chan-wook's Thirst, in a part that required numerous adult scenes with co-star Song Kang-ho. Kim felt that she learned much from working alongside Song, while Park commended her versatility in showing the different sides to her character. Thirst topped the South Korean box office during its opening weekend with over one million admissions, and was invited to the 2009 Cannes Film Festival where it won the Jury Prize. Richard Corliss of Time praised Kim's performance in the film, saying, "It's the lovely Kim, just 22, who is the revelation here. She can play – no, she can be – a creature of mute docility, then searching ardor, then explosive eroticism, then murderous intent. She is Lady Chatterley and Lady Macbeth in one smoldering package." The Hollywood Reporters Maggie Lee was more critical, commenting, "[Kim's] high-pitched neurosis is sometimes grating, but for a relative newcomer, she keeps her continuous personality transformations in stride," while Kyu Hyun Kim of OhmyNews said, "Kim is stunningly sexy in both wilted-housewife and full-blown femme fatale modes, and throws all of herself into the role," but considered her "a bit too young and contemporary" for the role. She was a co-recipient of the Best Actress award at the 42nd Sitges Film Festival (shared with Elena Anaya for Hierro), and received further nominations at the Blue Dragon Film Awards, the Green Globe Film Awards, and the Baeksang Arts Awards.

Kim was reunited with director E J-yong for Actresses, a low-budget film in which she and five other leading Korean actresses portray themselves at a special Vogue magazine shoot. Like her co-stars, Kim agreed to take part with no guarantee and shared writing credits. The film opened on 10 December 2009.

In 2011, Kim was to star opposite Eric Mun in KBS's action drama Poseidon, set for broadcast in July 2011. However they dropped out when production was halted after the Bombardment of Yeonpyeong incident in November 2010. Then Kim appeared in the war film The Front Line, playing a sharpshooter.

Then Kim once again worked with E J-yong for the short How to Fall in Love in 10 Minutes, as part of the Samsung Galaxy Note-sponsored film Cine Note. E J-yong had contacted actors that he's personally close to and offered them the roles, and most of them accepted without pay based on their friendship and loyalty to him, Kim included. The filmmaking process was later depicted in Behind the Camera, E's 2013 mockumentary with a similar concept as Actresses.

Kim then dyed her hair pink for the 2012 comedy Over My Dead Body, which she said she greatly enjoyed filming, being a fan of the genre. This was followed by a leading role in the science fiction-thriller film 11 A.M., which was released in the second half of 2013.

Kim returned to television in 2013 in the KBS period epic The Blade and Petal set in the Goguryeo dynasty, her first TV drama in seven years. In 2014, Kim played a pickpocket in the jTBC cable comedy series Steal Heart. Minority Opinion, her courtroom drama alongside Yoon Kye-sang and Yoo Hae-jin which had wrapped filming in 2013, was released in theaters in 2015.

In 2017, Kim starred in action thriller film The Villainess. The film was invited to the Cannes Film Festival, where it had its world premiere.

In 2018, Kim starred in military thriller The Discloser. The same year, she returned to the small screen in OCN's fantasy thriller drama Children of a Lesser God.

In 2020, Kim starred in the historical fantasy drama Arthdal Chronicles, alongside Song Joong-ki, Kim Ji-won and other notable names.

In November 2022, Kim signed with Ghost Studio.

Filmography

Film

Television series

Web series

Web shows

Music video

Awards and nominations

References

External links

 
 
 

1987 births
South Korean film actresses
South Korean television actresses
South Korean female models
People from South Jeolla Province
People from Suncheon
Kyung Hee University alumni
Living people
21st-century South Korean actresses
South Korean hapkido practitioners
South Korean female taekwondo practitioners
South Korean Muay Thai practitioners